Yates Spring is a spring in Catoosa County, in the U.S. state of Georgia.

History
Yates Spring was named for Major Presley Yates, who settled there in the 1830s.

References

Bodies of water of Catoosa County, Georgia
Springs of Georgia (U.S. state)